"Indian Summer" is a song by Welsh rock band Stereophonics. It was released as the second single from their eighth studio album Graffiti on the Train (2013). It was released as a digital download in the United Kingdom on 21 January 2013 and as a limited edition 10" vinyl single on 25 February. The song  peaked at number 30 on the UK Singles Chart on 10 March 2013, becoming their 1st UK Top 40 single since 2007 and 25th UK Top 40 single in total.  As of 2022, it currently remains their most recent UK Top 40 hit.
 
The song was written by the band's lead singer Kelly Jones.

Music video
A music video to accompany the release of "Indian Summer" was first released onto YouTube on 17 January 2013. It marks Jamie Morrison's first appearance in a music video for the band, even though Javier Weyler played the recorded drums on the track before his departure. It was shot in Leicestershire at a combination of the Music Cafe on Braunstone Gate in the city as well as the Great Central Railway which runs through the county. Kelly Jones directed the music video starring Caroline Ford as a girl who seduces a young musician (Kerr Logan, playing a younger version of Kelly) during the course of a train journey.

Track listings

Charts

Certifications

Release history

References

2013 singles
Stereophonics songs
Songs written by Kelly Jones
2012 songs